RW Cygni is a semiregular variable star in the constellation Cygnus, about a degree east of 2nd magnitude γ Cygni.  Its apparent magnitude varies between 8.05 and 9.70 and its spectral type between M3 and M4.

Distance
RW Cygni is assumed to be a member of the Cygnus OB9 Stellar Association and therefore around 3,600 light-years from the Solar System.

Properties
Its spectral type is given in the General Catalogue of Variable Stars as M2-4Ia-Iab, covering the range of previously published values. It has been defined as a standard star for the MK spectral classification of M3-M4Ia-Iab. Using the more conservative figure, if it was placed at the center of Solar System, it would be extend past the orbit of Mars and into the Asteroid Belt.

RW Cygni is classified as a semiregular variable star. It is given the subtype SRc, indicating that it is a cool supergiant. No long secondary period has been detected.

See also 
BC Cygni
BI Cygni
NML Cygni
KY Cygni

References 

M-type supergiants
101023
Semiregular variable stars
Cygnus (constellation)
BD+39 4208
Cygni, RW
IRAS catalogue objects
J20285059+3958543